Anthony 'Tony' Alan James (born 1955) is a male retired British cyclist.

Cycling career
He represented England in the 4,000 metres team pursuit, at the 1978 Commonwealth Games in Edmonton, Alberta, Canada, the team went on to win a bronze medal and consisted of Paul Fennell, Tony Doyle and Glen Mitchell.

He won two British National Track Championships in 1979 and 1980 and was a professional rider from 1980 until 1988. He also won the British National Omnium Championships in 1985.

References

Living people
1955 births
British male cyclists
Commonwealth Games medallists in cycling
Commonwealth Games bronze medallists for England
Cyclists at the 1978 Commonwealth Games
20th-century British people
Medallists at the 1978 Commonwealth Games